Derek Griffiths  (born 15 July 1946) is a British actor, singer, and voice artist who appeared in numerous British children's television series in the 1960s to present and has more recently played parts in television drama.

Career
Griffiths was known in his early years for his Play School appearances alongside the likes of Chloe Ashcroft, Johnny Ball and Brian Cant. A talented multi-instrumentalist, he voiced over and sang the theme tune to Heads and Tails, a series of short animal films for children produced by BBC Television, and also sang and played the theme tune to the cartoon Bod. Another children's TV role was in Granada Television's early 1980s series Film Fun, in which he played the entire staff of a cinema (the manager, the commissionaire (with the catchphrase "Get on with it!"), the projectionist, the usherette and also himself) while also showing cartoons such as Bugs Bunny, Daffy Duck and Wile E. Coyote and Road Runner. He appeared on Crown Court (1973) as an accused fraudster Raoul Lapointe, from the Belgian Congo. In 1975, Griffiths played Ko-Ko in The Black Mikado at London's Cambridge Theatre. He was also the English voice of SuperTed (SuperTed was originally made in Welsh).

In 1997, Griffiths originated the role of Lumière in the original West End production of Beauty and the Beast at the Dominion Theatre and played the role of the Child Catcher in the West End run of Chitty Chitty Bang Bang at the London Palladium.

In 2014, Griffiths was presented with a BASCA Gold Badge of Merit award. This was in acknowledgement of his unique contribution to music.

From 2016, he played Freddie Smith in Coronation Street: he left the role in March 2017 to star in a stage production of Driving Miss Daisy. In 2021, he joined the London cast of The Mousetrap.

Children's television work
Play School (1971–81)
Play Away (1971)
Cabbages and Kings (1972)
Various Look and Read stories as singer, including:
"Cloud Burst" (1974) as singer.
"The King's Dragon" (1977) as singer.
"Sky Hunter" (1978) as singer.
"The Boy From Space" (1980) as singer.
"Dark Towers" (1981) as singer.
"Fair ground!" (1983) as singer.
"Geordie Racer" (1988) as singer.
"Through The Dragon's Eye" (1989) as singer.
"Earth Warp" (1994) as voiceover and singer.
"Watch It!" (1980–83) regular continuity announcer on children's ITV segment for Yorkshire Television.
Bod (1975) where he composed the theme music for each of the main five characters.
"Ring-a-Ding!" (1975) stories & singer 
"Heads and Tails" (1978) as voiceover and singer.
"Insight" (1980) as presenter and various characters in this Yorkshire Television educational series for deaf and hearing-impaired children
Dinosaurs: Fun, Fact and Fantasy (1982) as the voice of Dil the Crocodile.
SuperTed (1983–1985) as the voice of SuperTed.
The Further Adventures of SuperTed (1989) as the voice of SuperTed in the UK version.
Muzzy in Gondoland (1986) as the voice of Bob and Corvax.
King Greenfingers (1989) as narrator.
The World of Peter Rabbit and Friends (1993) as Simpkin in animated short stories based on the popular book series.
Christopher Crocodile (1993) as narrator.
Dragon Tales (1999–2005) as narrator for the audiobooks 
Mio Mao (2005) as the narrator and all of the characters in the UK dub.
Film Fun
Little Red Tractor (2004) as the voices of Mr Jones and Walter
Animal Antics (1997–2015) as narrator.Tinga Tinga Tales (2010-2011) as the voices of Cricket and Skunk.Sarah & Duck  (2014) Series 2 Episode 3: "Cloud Tower" as Cloud CaptainHilda (2020) Series 2 Episode 8: "The Fifty Year Night" as Mr. OstenfeldThe Dumping Ground (2021) as Larry Meadow

Comedy television workPlease Sir! (1968)Till Death Us Do Part (1972 Christmas Special)The Cobblers of Umbridge (1973) as The people of Umbridge.Marty Back Together Again (1974)Don't Drink the Water (1974) as Carlos.Battle of the Sexes (1976)Hi, Summer! (1977)Terry and June (1985) as the Prince.The Funny Side (1985)Porkpie (1995) as Benji.The Bleak Old Shop of Stuff (2012) as Pusweasel.Way to Go (2013) as Elroy.Man Down, Series 4 Episode 5 (2017), as Blind Jim

Other television workCrown Court (1973) as Raoul Lapointe.Don't Ask Me! (1974)Casualty (1999) as Duke Baines.Holby City as Greg Martin (2004) and Ted O'Connor (2011).Doctors as Renton Miles (broadcast 15 May 2015) and Roger Saintfield (7 June 2022).Silent Witness "River’s Edge" broadcast 2 February 2016, as DS Malcolm Guillam.Coronation Street  2016–2017 as Freddie SmithSmall Axe (2020) as C. L. R. James.Midsomer Murders (2021) as Rev. Nigel Brookthorpe.Casualty (2022) as Donald Charles.

Appearances
Derek Griffiths appears in This Is Your LifeAdvertising work
Griffiths is also used frequently in advertising. In the past, he has won the Italian advertising Oscar for a series of comedy commercials.

Film workUp Pompeii! (1971) as Steam SlaveUp the Chastity Belt (1971) as SaladinUp the Front (1972) as El PuncturoRentadick (1972) as HensonThe Alf Garnett Saga (1972) as RexDon't Just Lie There, Say Something! (1974) as JohnnyAll I Want Is You... and You... and You... (1974) as Taxi DriverAre You Being Served? (1977) as the EmirThe Strange Case of the End of Civilization as We Know It (1977) as Bus ConductorWatership Down (1978) as Voice of Vervain and ChervilRising Damp (1980) as AlecFierce Creatures (1997) as Gerry UngulatesRun for Your Wife (2012) as Actor on SwingGallowwalkers (2012) as Mosca

Theatre
In the theatre, Griffiths has been particularly associated with the Royal Exchange, Manchester. His roles include:The Royal Exchange Theatre Company Words & Pictures 1976–1998, .

 Ko-Ko, The Black Mikado adapted from Gilbert & Sullivan. Directed by Braham Murray at the Cambridge Theatre, London (1975).
 Dick Whittington by Derek Griffiths. World premiere directed by Derek Griffiths at the Royal Exchange, Manchester (1977).
 Athos, The Three Musketeers by Braham Murray and Derek Griffiths. World premiere directed by Braham Murray at the Royal Exchange, Manchester (1979).
 Frontignac, Have you anything to declare? by Maurice Hennequin. British premiere directed by Braham Murray for the Royal Exchange, Manchester at the Roundhouse, London (1980).
 Rick, The Nerd by Larry Shue. European premiere directed by Braham Murray at the Royal Exchange, Manchester (1982).
 Khlestakov, The Government Inspector by Nikolai Gogol. Directed by Braham Murray at the Royal Exchange, Manchester (1983).
 The bluebird of unhappiness by Woody Allen. Directed by Braham Murray at the Royal Exchange, Manchester (1987).
 Feste, Twelfth Night. Directed by Braham Murray at the Royal Exchange, Manchester (1988).
 Oscar, The Odd Couple by Neil Simon. Directed by Ronald Harwood at the Royal Exchange, Manchester (1989).
 Sergeant Kite, The Recruiting Officer by George Farquhar. Directed by Braham Murray at the Royal Exchange, Manchester (1992).
 Feste, Twelfth Night at the Royal Shakespeare Theatre, Stratford-upon-Avon (1994) and the Theatre Royal, Newcastle upon Tyne (1994).
 Sebastien, Nude With Violin by Noël Coward. Directed by Marianne Elliott at the Royal Exchange, Manchester (1999).
 Truscott, Loot by Joe Orton. Directed by Braham Murray at the Royal Exchange, Manchester (2001).
 Harpagon, The Miser by Moliere. Directed by Helena Kaut-Howson at the Royal Exchange, Manchester (2009).
 Lumiére "Beauty and the Beast" Dominion Theatre (1994)
 Rev. Tooker, Cat on a Hot Tin Roof'' (2009).
 The Engineer. Miss Saigon (1990's)

Audio
 Ladybird Books Classic Collection (1995) as Narrator of Tales from The Jungle Book and The Wind in the Willows
 BBC Radio 4 I, Regress (Series 1, Episode 3 - Jan 2012) as Mr Pigeon

Honours
Griffiths was appointed Member of the Order of the British Empire (MBE) in the 2020 New Year Honours for services to drama and diversity.

References

External links
.
Cat on a hot tin roof  at Novello Theatre London.

1946 births
Living people
20th-century English male actors
21st-century English male actors
Audiobook narrators
BBC television presenters
Black British male actors
English male film actors
English male television actors
English male voice actors
English people of Ghanaian descent
English television presenters
Male actors from Surrey
Members of the Order of the British Empire
People from Woking